The Electron-Land Cup is a Go competition.

Outline
The Electron-Land Cup is sponsored by Korean Economic News, Baduk TV, and Cyber Kiwon. The format is lightning knockout. The tournament consists of 24 players split into 3 groups of 8. The first group is the Blue Dragon (Cheong-ryong), for players who are 25 or under. The White Tiger (Baekho), for players who are from 26 to 50 years old. The last group is the Phoenix (Bonghwang) for players 50 or above. The komidashi is 6.5 points, and the time limits are 20 minutes for each player plus byo-yomi. The final is a best of three match. The winner's purse is 40 million SKW/$42,500.

Past winners

Go competitions in South Korea